Rembów may refer to the following places:
Rembów, Łask County in Łódź Voivodeship (central Poland)
Rembów, Sieradz County in Łódź Voivodeship (central Poland)
Rembów, Świętokrzyskie Voivodeship (south-central Poland)